The 1967 Virginia Cavaliers football team represented the University of Virginia during the 1967 NCAA University Division football season. The Cavaliers were led by third-year head coach George Blackburn and played their home games at Scott Stadium in Charlottesville, Virginia. They competed as members of the Atlantic Coast Conference, finishing in fourth.

Schedule

References

Virginia
Virginia Cavaliers football seasons
Virginia Cavaliers football